Los pacientes del doctor García is an upcoming Spanish drama television series adapting the novel of the same name by Almudena Grandes. The cast is led by Javier Rey, Verónica Echegui, and Tamar Novas.

Plot 
The plot follows the mishaps of doctor Guillermo García, who remains living in Madrid after the Francoist seizure of the country, owing to a false identity provided by his friend Manuel Arroyo. Years later, García meets again with Arroyo in 1946, as the latter returns from exile to carry out a secret mission in the city.

Cast

Production 
The series is a RTVE, Diagonal (Banijay Iberia), and DeAPlaneta production, and it had the participation of Netflix. Shooting started in January 2022 in Segovia and wrapped by June 2022 in Madrid. Shooting locations also included Guadalajara.

References 

Upcoming television series
Upcoming drama television series
Spanish-language television shows
RTVE shows
Television series based on Spanish novels
Television shows set in Madrid
Television series set in 1946
Television shows filmed in Spain